was a Japanese photographer.

References

Japanese photographers
1890 births
1944 deaths